

Qualification system
A total of 80 karatekas will qualify to compete at the games (eight per weight category). There will be four qualification events for athletes to qualify, and the host nation is automatically qualified in each event. A nation may enter a maximum of one athlete per weight category.

Qualification timeline

Qualification summary

Men

-60 kg

-67 kg

-75 kg

-84 kg

+84 kg

Women

-50 kg

-55 kg

-61 kg

-68 kg

+68 kg

References

P
P
Qualification for the 2015 Pan American Games
Karate at the 2015 Pan American Games